Hold-ups or stay-ups (in the United States also referred to as thigh-high stockings or simply thigh highs) are stockings with an elasticized band at the top, designed to hold the stockings up when worn, without the use of a garter belt or garters (British English: suspenders). Thigh highs are held up by one or more bands sewn to the top that is backed with silicone on its inner surface. This ensures the thigh highs stay in position because of the elastic and the friction of the silicone against the skin. The silicone can become ineffective by contact with body lotions, oils and talcum powder, as they all reduce the friction of the silicone. Thigh highs are designed so that the elastic band exerts just the right pressure on the wearer's thigh, avoiding any uncomfortable tightness or unflattering muffin-top effect. Sometimes thigh highs are preferred to pantyhose for hygiene reasons, because they reduce excessive microbial growth around the groin due to humidity and warmth. 

Thigh highs may be chosen because of the classic popular "stocking top" line, and there are no suspender bumps to be seen through a skirt or dress. Like stockings and pantyhose, the thickness of thigh-highs is measured in denier.

History
With the invention of nylon, thigh high stockings took center stage in women's fashion. While high-end consumers never lost their fascination with silk thigh highs, their nylon counterparts were so ubiquitous that they ended up baptizing the entire stocking family. In popular use, stockings were referred to as "nylons" in the 1940s.

In the 1960s, thigh highs retreated towards a more marginal place in women's fashion. It is accepted that the popularity of the mini-skirt was an important factor in this. As the skirt was growing shorter and shorter, revealing the top line of the stockings became uncommon, and thigh highs became superseded by pantyhose.

As a term, "hold-ups" was first used by "Pretty Polly" in 1967 for its self-supporting stockings. The term was not registered by the company, and has since become a generic trademark for the stocking style.

Manufacturing process
Modern stockings, pantyhose, and thigh highs are made by either flat knitting or the use of circular machines. Flat knitting is the original hosiery manufacturing technique of the 1930s–1950s. After the fabric has been produced, each thigh high is individually seamed. The top of the seam has a "finishing loop", a small hole that every seamed thigh high has as a result of the machinist turning the welt—the thigh high top—inside out, in order to finish off. Once sewn, the thigh highs are "boarded". This is a process where each thigh high is stretched over a flat metal leg form and "set" with steam. The knit tightens, creases are eliminated and the leg is correctly shaped. Because the process is time consuming, seamed thigh highs are never cheap. Also, around a third of production—especially during the production of sheer stockings—is discarded during quality control.

Thigh highs are now most often produced on circular machines that eliminate back seams by knitting tubes that are then "set" to the shape of the leg. While the first circular machines produced sheer stockings with a reinforced heel pocket, modern machines have eliminated this, offering a better fit regardless of the wearer's shoe size.

The addition of lycra to the stocking yarn was possibly the biggest break-through in hosiery manufacturing, the result being thigh highs that combine elasticity with the ability to cling to the leg.

See also
 Fully fashioned stockings
 Garter
 Stocking

References

Hosiery